Moti Babu Institute of Technology, Forbesganj - MBIT has been established with a view to impart technical and professional education in the periphery of Forbesganj in Araria district. MBIT is situated in area of 18 acres in the Rampur village, Araria district and is 300 km from Patna.It is also very near to Nepal's second largest city Biratnagar (10 km). Bihar Industrial Area Development Authority(Biada) was instrumental in allotting land in Araria district. Inaugurated on 22 July 2013, MBIT is affiliated with Aryabhatta Knowledge University, Patna, Moti Babu Institute of Technology is the brainchild of Amit Kumar Das, a NRI billionaire from Bihar, who currently resides in Sydney. A number of national and international agencies have been instrumental in assisting MBIT to create an academic alliance with TAFE, South Australia. MBIT foundation stone was laid in 2010.MBIT was named after Amit kumar Das’ father, Moti Babu.

Admission
The admission procedure for different courses is as prescribed by the Government of Bihar and Aryabhatta Knowledge University, Patna, Bihar.

Courses offered
MBIT offers B.Tech courses in following streams with 300 seats (60 seats in each of 5 streams).
 Computer Science and Engineering - 60
 Electronics and Communications Engineering - 60
 Mechanical engineering - 60
 Civil engineering - 60
 Electrical engineering - 60

See also
Aryabhatta Knowledge University
Education in Bihar
 Nitish Kumar
 Forbesganj

References

External links
 Campus plan
 Official Facebook Page
 Official Twitter Page
 Edufever Page

Engineering colleges in Bihar
Forbesganj
Colleges affiliated to Aryabhatta Knowledge University
2013 establishments in Bihar
Educational institutions established in 2013